Patla  is a village in Kasaragod district in the state of Kerala, India.

References

Suburbs of Kasaragod